Cystiscus robini is a species of very small sea snail, a marine gastropod mollusk or micromollusk in the family Cystiscidae.

References

Gastropods described in 2018
Robini